The Zanzibar national football team represents Zanzibar in international football and is controlled by the Zanzibar Football Federation.

History
Zanzibar is not a member of FIFA and is therefore not eligible to enter the World Cup. The island is part of the nation of Tanzania, which holds FIFA recognition at the international level. Prior to the union of Zanzibar and Tanganyika in 1964, Zanzibar was a fully independent member of the Confederation of African Football (CAF), but never qualified for the African Nations Cup.

Zanzibar was a provisional member of the N.F.-Board. The team placed second in the 2006 FIFI Wild Cup tournament, losing 4–1 on penalties to the Turkish Republic of Northern Cyprus in the final. For that tournament, they were coached by the German comedian Oliver Pocher.

Their U-20 team also played in the 2006 ELF Cup, finishing fourth of eight, winning one game (1–0 against Kyrgyzstan's national football team) and drawing twice (against Gagauzia and Greenland) before losing 5–0 to Northern Cyprus in the semifinal. They regularly play in the CECAFA Cup, which includes national teams from Central and East Africa, and in 1995 they became champions, winning the final match 1–0 against the host nation, Uganda.

In March 2017, Zanzibar were admitted to CAF, becoming its 55th member, only for their membership to be rescinded four months later, with CAF president Ahmad Ahmad claiming the region should never have been admitted as it is not a sovereign nation.

Notable players

  Ally Badru - played for El Qanah FC  and Al Bashaer

Competition records

CECAFA Cup
Zanzibar competed in the Gossage Cup from 1949 to 1967, when the competition was renamed to the East and Central African Senior Challenge Cup:

Africa Cup of Nations
In March 2017, Zanzibar were admitted to the Confederation of African Football, becoming eligible for the Africa Cup of Nations.
The invitation was rescinded in July when FIFA rules forbade two teams from one nation.

Non-FIFA tournaments

World tournaments

Head-to-head record

Records

Players in bold are still active with Zanzibar.

Most appearances

Top goalscorers

Managers

 Gheorghe Dungu (1972–1974)
 Oliver Pocher (2005–2006)
 Abdel-Fattah Abbas (2006–2008)
 Souleymane Sané (2008–2011)
 Stewart Hall (2010)
 Hemed "Morocco" Suleiman (2017–2021)
 Hababuu Ali Omar (2021–present)

References

External links
East and Central African Championship (CECAFA) at RSSSF

 
CONIFA member associations
African N.F.-Board teams
Football in Zanzibar